Vestron Pictures was an American film studio and distributor, a former division of Austin O. Furst, Jr.'s Vestron Inc., that is best known for their 1987 release of Dirty Dancing.

The company is a defunct successor corporation of the earlier video distributor, Vestron Video. Vestron also has had a genre film division, Lightning Pictures, a spin-off of Vestron's Lightning Video, headed by Lawrence Kasanoff, who would later go on to found Lightstorm Entertainment and Threshold Entertainment.

History 
The company was initially kicked off to "pursue projects" with top producers, namely Steve Tisch, Larry Turman and Gene Kirkwood, and Vestron would have to finance projects, and do a decided number of series and relationships. The first Vestron Pictures film released was Malcolm, the Australian feature film that launched a New York run on July 18, 1986.

On October 1, 1986, Vestron Pictures and Gotham-based financial outfit Integrated Resources, Inc., which cost a $100 million joint venture to handle underwriting of the production and distribution of 15 in-house Vestron Pictures' feature films, which planned to run from 1987 to 1989, and had to pain a distinctly upbeat of the co-venture's potential.

In December 1986, Vestron Pictures planned to produce ten films and to acquire 10-15 films in order to become a virtual low-budget film studio, and gave production budgets of under $2 million to the Lightning Pictures genre label, as titles from the mainstream label ran $2–6 million; the company was relegated to low-budget production without resorting to exploitation filmmaking, and shot for a broad base that expanded into all segments of the viewing audience.

In 1987, the Vestron Pictures unit acquired worldwide rights to Bob Balaban's Parents, from production company Parents Productions, and Roger Holzberg's Midnight Crossing, from another independent production company, Team Effort Productions, with another Vestron subsidiary, Interaccess Film Distribution, to handle foreign sales and distribution rights on the two pictures.

In September 1987, upon the success of the company's biggest hit, Dirty Dancing, Vestron acquired 24 productions and pickups that were slated for release throughout 1988, and toward that end, the company unveiled four productions before the end of the year, as well as four acquisitions, and called for quality pictures with budgets of $6 million.

In October 1987, Vestron Pictures bought the rights to the two films from production company Double Helix Films, Mace and Funland. Vestron would handle theatrical, television, pay cable and syndicated TV rights to the former, and home video, cable and TV rights to the latter film, and Double Helix Films would retain the rights to the two films for foreign distribution.

In November 1987, Vestron Pictures studied the Australia, Holland and the Benelux countries, eyeing openings of theatrical operations in those territories. The company already had distribution offices in the U.K. and Japan, and would cooperate with Vestron's international sales subsidiary, Interaccess Film Distribution. It decided not to set up shop in France due to declining theatrical attendance and a glut of cinemas, some of which formed a crowded field in the nation.

Vestron Pictures' parent company, Vestron, Inc., filed for Chapter 11 Bankruptcy and went out of business in 1991, with their assets being acquired by LIVE Entertainment. Today, Lionsgate owns the rights to the Vestron library after acquiring Artisan Entertainment in 2003.

Productions

Vestron Pictures

Lightning Pictures

References 

Mass media companies established in 1986
Mass media companies disestablished in 1992
Defunct mass media companies of the United States
Film distributors of the United States
American companies established in 1986
American film studios
Lionsgate subsidiaries
1992 mergers and acquisitions